Harry Schreurs (11 December 1901 – 16 October 1973) was a Dutch footballer. He played in two matches for the Netherlands national football team in 1928.

References

External links
 
 
 

1901 births
1973 deaths
Dutch footballers
Netherlands international footballers
Place of birth missing
Association football midfielders